The Juno Awards of 1997, representing Canadian music industry achievements of the previous year, were awarded on 9 March 1997 in Hamilton, Ontario at a ceremony in the Copps Coliseum. Jann Arden was host for the major ceremonies which were broadcast on CBC Television.

Nominations were announced on 29 January 1997. Major winners were Celine Dion and The Tragically Hip.

Nominees and winners

Best Female Vocalist
Winner: Celine Dion

Other Nominees:
 Deborah Cox
 Lara Fabian
 Amanda Marshall
 Alannah Myles

Best Male Vocalist
Winner: Bryan Adams

Other Nominees:
 Paul Brandt
 Corey Hart
 John McDermott
 Neil Young

Best New Solo Artist
Winner: Terri Clark

Other Nominees:
 Damhnait Doyle
 Chantal Kreviazuk
 Wendy Lands
 Duane Steele

Group of the Year
Winner: The Tragically Hip

Other Nominees:
 54-40
 I Mother Earth
 Moist
 Noir Silence

Best New Group
Winner: The Killjoys

Other Nominees:
 Limblifter
 Pluto
 Starkicker
 Victor

Songwriter of the Year
Winner: Alanis Morissette (Glen Ballard, co-songwriter)

Other Nominees:
 Bryan Adams (with Robert John "Mutt" Lange)
 Dean McTaggart
 Amy Sky
 The Tragically Hip

Best Country Female Vocalist
Winner: Shania Twain

Other Nominees:
 Terri Clark
 Patricia Conroy
 Rachel Matkin
 Michelle Wright

Best Country Male Vocalist
Winner: Paul Brandt

Other Nominees:
 Chris Cummings
 Charlie Major
 Jason McCoy
 Duane Steele

Best Country Group or Duo
Winner: The Rankin Family

Other Nominees:
 Farmer's Daughter
 Prairie Oyster
 Quartette
 Thomas Wade and Wayward

International Achievement Award
Winners:
Celine Dion
Alanis Morissette
Shania Twain

Best Instrumental Artist
Winner: Ashley MacIsaac

Other Nominees:
 Richard Abel
 Hennie Bekker
 Samuel Reid and Ernest Lyons
 Sandule and Nikolai

Best Producer
Winner: Garth Richardson, "Bar-X-the Rocking M" by Melvins and "Mailman" by The Jesus Lizard

Other Nominees:
 Bryan Adams (with Robert John "Mutt" Lange), "The Only Thing That Looks Good on Me Is You" and "Let's Make a Night to Remember" by Bryan Adams
 Bruce Fairbairn (with The Cranberries), "Free to Decide" and "When You're Gone" by The Cranberries
 David Foster, "Runaway" by The Corrs and "Both Sides Now" by Natalie Cole
 Corey Hart, "Black Cloud Rain" and "Simplicity" by Corey Hart

Best Recording Engineer
Winner: Paul Northfield, "Another Sunday" and "Leave It Alone"

Other Nominees:
 Stuart Bruce, "Seeds of Love" and "God Rest Ye Merry Gentlemen" by Loreena McKennitt
 Colin Nairne, "Secrets in Your Heart" and "White Water" by Murray McLauchlan
 Lenny de Rose, "Get Up" by Starkicker and "Huron Carol" by Don Ross
 Randy Staub, "Until it Sleeps" and "Hero of the Day" by Metallica

Canadian Music Hall of Fame
Winner: Lenny Breau (posthumously), Gil Evans (posthumously), Maynard Ferguson, Moe Koffman, Rob McConnell

Walt Grealis Special Achievement Award
Winner: Dan Gibson

Nominated and winning albums

Best Album
Winner: Trouble at the Henhouse, The Tragically Hip

Other Nominees:
 Amanda Marshall, Amanda Marshall
 18 til I Die, Bryan Adams
 Falling Into You, Celine Dion
 Hi™ How Are You Today?, Ashley MacIsaac

Best Children's Album
Winner: Songs from The Tree House, Martha Johnson

Other Nominees:
 Jumpin' Jack, Jack Grunsky
 Like a Ripple on the Water, Kim Brodey and Jerry Brodey
 Maestro Orpheus and the World Clock, R.H. Thomson
 Walking in the Sun, Jake Chenier

Best Classical Album (Solo or Chamber Ensemble)
Winner: Scriabin: The Complete Piano Sonatas, Marc-André Hamelin

Other Nominees:
 Bach: French Suites, Angela Hewitt
 Fialkowska Plays Szymanowski, Janina Fialkowska
 Music of Bach's Sons, Les Violins du Roy
 Paganini: 24 Caprices, James Ehnes

Best Classical Album (Large Ensemble)
Winner: Ginastera/Villa-Lobos/Evangelista, I Musici de Montréal

Other Nominees:
 Handel: Water Music, Tafelmusik, musical director Jeanne Lamon
 Kodaly: Hary Janos, Peacock Variations, l'Orchestre symphonique de Montréal, conductor Charles Dutoit
 Mussrogsky: Pictures of an Exhibition, Toronto Symphony Orchestra, conductor Jukka-Pekka Saraste
 Ravel: The Piano Concertos, l'Orchestre symphonique de Montréal, conductor Charles Dutoit, soloist Jean-Yves Thibaudet

Best Classical Album (Vocal or Choral Performance)
Winner: Berlioz: La Damnation de Faust, Choeur et orchestre symphonique de Montréal, conductor Charles Dutoit

Other Nominees:
 Benjamin Britten: The Canticles, tenor Benjamin Butterfield, baritone Brett Polegato, countertenor Daniel Taylor
 Chi il Bel Sogno... What a Beautiful Dream, l'Orchestre symphonique de Laval, soprano Manon Feuble
 Purcell: Halcyon Days, soprano Nancy Argenta
 Richard Margison Sings French and Italian Arias, Canadian Opera Company Orchestra, tenor Richard Margison

Best Album Design
Winner: John Rummen and Crystal Heald, Decadence - Ten Years of Various Nettwerk

Other Nominees:
 Doug Aucoin, Living River by Rawlins Cross
 Eve Hartling, Jeff Kleinsmith, and Jannie McInnes, So Wound by Jale
 John Rummen, Rarities, B-Sides and Other Stuff by Sarah McLachlan
 Paolo Venturi, Wayne Hoecherl, Nest by Odds

Best Blues/Gospel Album
Winner: Right to Sing the Blues, Long John Baldry

Other Nominees:
 Alive and Loose, Kenny "Blues Boss" Wayne
 Fire, Tongues of Fire
 If My Daddy Could See Me Now, Johnny V
 Sixteen Shades of Blue, The Whiteley Brothers

Best Selling Album (Foreign or Domestic)
Winner: Falling Into You, Céline Dion

Other Nominees:
 Daydream, Mariah Carey
 Mellon Collie and the Infinite Sadness, The Smashing Pumpkins
 The Score, Fugees
 (What's the Story) Morning Glory?, Oasis

Best Mainstream Jazz Album
Winner: Ancestors, Renee Rosnes

Other Nominees:
 Even Canadians Get the Blues, Rob McConnell and The Boss Brass
 Live at Bourbon St., Lenny Breau with Dave Young
 Oscar Peterson Meets Roy Hargrove and Ralph Moore, Oscar Peterson
 Two by Two, Piano Bass Duets Vol II, Dave Young

Best Contemporary Jazz Album
Winner: Africville Suite, Joe Sealy

Other Nominees:
 FireWater, NOJO
 Spirit in the Air, Sonny Greenwich
 Time Zones, James Gelfand
 Touché, Paul Bley and Kenny Wheeler

Best Roots or Traditional Album - Group
Winner: Matapédia, Kate & Anna McGarrigle

Other Nominees:
 En Spectacle, La Bottine Souriante
 High or Hurtin', Blackie and the Rodeo Kings
 Living River, Rawlins Cross
 Victory Train, Bill Bourne and Shannon Johnson

Best Roots or Traditional Album - Solo
Winner: Drive-In Movie, Fred Eaglesmith

Other Nominees:
 Bal Canaille, Danielle Martineau
 Gulliver's Taxi, Murray McLauchlan
 Life on a String, Daniel Koulack
 No Boundaries, Natalie MacMaster

Best Alternative Album
Winner: One Chord to Another, Sloan

Other Nominees:
 It's Sydney or the Bush, The Inbreds
 Limblifter, Limblifter
 Purple Blue, Eric's Trip
 Self=title, Treble Charger

Best Selling Francophone Album
Winner: Live à Paris, Celine Dion

Other Nominees:
 Luce Dufault, Luce Dufault
 Noir Silence, Noir Silence
 Pure, Lara Fabian
 Quatre saisons dans le désordre, Daniel Bélanger

North Star Rock Album of the Year
Winner: Trouble at the Henhouse, The Tragically Hip

Other Nominees:
 Brand New Day, The Watchmen
 Hemi-Vision, Big Sugar
 Scenery and Fish, I Mother Earth
 Test for Echo, Rush

Nominated and winning releases

Single of the Year
Winner: "Ironic", Alanis Morissette

Other Nominees:
 "Ahead by a Century", The Tragically Hip
 "Because You Loved Me", Celine Dion
 "Birmingham", Amanda Marshall
 "Sleepy Maggie", Ashley MacIsaac

Best Classical Composition
Winner: Picasso Suite (1964), Harry Somers

Other Nominees:
 "The Charmer", Chan Ka Nin
 "Quintette for Winds", Malcolm Forsyth
 "Lyric for Orchestra (1960)", Harry Somers
 "Lonely Child", Claude Vivier

Best Rap Recording
Winner: What It Takes, Choclair

Other Nominees:
 Bright Lights, Big City, Scales Empire
 FitnRedi, Rascalz
 The Master Plan, Dream Warriors
 Naughty Dread, Kardinal Offishall

Best R&B/Soul Recording
Winner: Feelin' Alright, Carlos Morgan

Other Nominees:
 Blindfolded and Ready, The Earthtones
 In Another Lifetime, The McAuley Boys
 Never Stop, George St. Kitts
 Can I Get Close, Gavin Hope

Best Music of Aboriginal Canada Recording
Winner: Up Where We Belong, Buffy Sainte-Marie

Other Nominees:
 Freedom, Chester Knight and the Wind
 Innu Town, Claude McKenzie
 Go Back, Jerry Alfred and the Medicine Beat
 Tudjaat, Tudjaat

Best Reggae/Calypso Recording
Winner: Nana McLean, Nana McLean

Other Nominees:
 Just the Other Night, Lenn Hammond
 Rise Up!, Kali and Dub (Hayes Thurton)
 Rude Boy on the Bus, Adrian Miller
 time bomb, Tatix

Best Global Album
Winner: Africa Do Brasil, Paulo Ramos Group

Other Nominees:
 Anhata, Randev Pandit
 Asza, Asza
 Futur, Alpha Yaya Diallo
 Gravity, Jesse Cook

Best Dance Recording
Winner: "Astroplane (City of Love Mix)", BKS

Other Nominees:
 "All My Dreams (Don't Ever Leave) (Extended Skywalkers Mix)", Laya
 "Forever Young (Tempered Club Mix)", Temperance
 "Happy Days (original)", Paul Jacobs
 "In Your Arms (album version)", Emjay

Best Video
Winner: Jeth Weinrich, "Burned Out Car" by Junkhouse

Other Nominees:
 Andrew MacNaughtan, "Run Runaway" by Great Big Sea
 Stephen Scott and James Cooper, "Soaked" by The Killjoys
 Curtis Wehrfritz, "Someone Who's Cool" by Odds
 Eric Yealland, "Ahead by a Century" by The Tragically Hip

References

External links
Juno Awards site

1997
1997 music awards
1997 in Canadian music
Culture of Hamilton, Ontario